Henry Alden may refer to:
 Henry Bailey Alden (1862–1939), American architect
 Henry Mills Alden (1836–1919), American author and editor